Joseph Lasiri (born July 19, 1991) is an Italian Muay Thai fighter. He is currently signed to ONE Championship, where he is the reigning ONE Strawweight Muay Thai World Champion.

Lasiri is a WBC Muay Thai World Bantamweight Champion and a 5-times World Muay Thai Organization Pro-Am Champion.

Titles and Accomplishments

Amateur
International Federation of Muaythai Associations
 2012 IFMA European -54 kg / 118 lb C bronze  
World Muaythai Federation
 2012 WMF European Champion 51 kg /gold Bulgaria 
 2013 WMF World pro-am -51 kg Champion
World Muaythai Organization
 2014 WMO World Champion/ pro- am/ 54 kg 
2015 WMO World Champion/pro-am/54 kg 
2016 WMO World Champion/pro-am/54 kg  
2017 WMO World Champion/pro-am/54 kg

Professional
ONE Championship 
ONE Strawweight Muay Thai World Championship (One time, current)
Performance of the Night (One time) 
World Fighters Council
 2012 WFC European 56 kg champion 
2013 WFC European -56 kg  Champion
World Boxing Council Muaythai
 2017 WBC Muay Thai World Bantamweight -53.5 kg / 118 lb Champion

Muay Thai record

|-  style="background:#fbb;"
| 2022-11-19 || Loss ||align=left| Rodtang Jitmuangnon || ONE on Prime Video 4 || Kallang, Singapore || Decision (unanimous) || 5 || 3:00
|-
! style=background:white colspan=9 |
|-  style="background:#cfc;"
| 2022-05-20|| Win ||align=left| Prajanchai P.K.Saenchaimuaythaigym ||  ONE 157 || Kallang, Singapore || TKO (retirement) || 3 || 3:00
|-
! style=background:white colspan=9 |
|- style="background:#cfc;"
| 2021-12-03|| Win ||align=left| Asahi Shinagawa || ONE: Winter Warriors II || Kallang, Singapore || KO (Punch & knee) || 1 ||2:06 
|-  style="background:#fbb;"
| 2021-04-02|| Loss||align=left| Panpetch Or.Pitisak || Muaymanwansuk, Rangsit Stadium || Rangsit, Thailand ||Decision ||5 ||3:00
|- style="background:#cfc;"
| 2020-11-20 || Win||align=left| Rocky Ogden || ONE Championship: Inside the Matrix 4 || Kallang, Singapore || Decision (Split) || 3 ||3:00
|- style="background:#fbb;"
| 2019-09-06 || Loss ||align=left| Mongkolpetch Petchyindee || ONE Championship: Immortal Triumph || Ho Chi Minh City, Vietnam || Decision (Majority) || 3 || 3:00
|- style="background:#cfc;"
| 2019-03-31|| Win||align=left| Hiroki Akimoto || ONE Championship: A New Era || Tokyo, Japan || Decision (Majority) || 3 ||3:00
|-  style="background:#fbb;"
| 2019-01-18|| Loss||align=left| Jonathan Haggerty || ONE Championship: Eternal Glory || Jakarta, Indonesia || Decision (Unanimous) || 3 || 3:00
|-  style="background:#fbb;"
| 2018-11-23|| Loss||align=left| Josh Tonna || ONE Championship: Conquest of Champions ||Pasay, Philippines || Decision (Unanimous)|| 3 || 3:00
|-  style="background:#fbb;"
| 2018-05-18|| Loss||align=left| Singtongnoi Por.Telakun || ONE Championship: Unstoppable Dreams || Kallang, Singapore || TKO (Doctor Stoppage) || 2 || 2:36
|-  style="background:#fbb;"
| 2018-01-26|| Loss||align=left| Sam-A Gaiyanghadao || ONE Championship: Global Superheroes || Manila, Philippines || KO (Straight Left) || 2 || 2:30
|- style="background:#cfc;"
| 2017-04-15|| Win||align=left| Tristan Caetano || Divonne Challenge 3 || France || Decision  || 3 ||3:00
|- style="background:#cfc;"
| 2017-02-18|| Win||align=left| Mohamed Bouchareb || Ring War || Monza, Italy || Decision  || 5 ||3:00 
|-
! style=background:white colspan=9 |
|- style="background:#fbb;"
| 2016-10-02|| Loss||align=left| Yodkowklai Fairtex || MAX Muay Thai|| Thailand || KO || 1 ||
|- style="background:#cfc;"
| 2015-12-12|| Win||align=left| Tristan Caetano || The Night of Kick and Punch 2015 || Italy || KO (Punches and Knee)|| 2 ||
|- style="background:#fbb;"
| 2015-10-24|| Loss||align=left| Islem Hamech || La Nuit Des Challenges 14 || France || Decision || 3 || 3:00
|- style="background:#cfc;"
| 2015-04-26|| Win||align=left| Andy Howson ||  || United Kingdom || TKO || 2 ||
|- style="background:#cfc;"
| 2014-10-19|| Win||align=left| Reece Thomson ||  || London, England || Decision || 5 || 3:00
|- style="background:#cfc;"
| 2014-04-12|| Win||align=left| Antar Kacem || Championnat du Monde de Boxe Thai || France || Decision || 5 || 3:00
|- style="background:#cfc;"
| 2014-04-12|| Win||align=left|  Daniel Saporito || Ring War|| Italy || Decision || 3 || 3:00
|- style="background:#cfc;"
| 2013-11-09|| Win||align=left| Pascal Kessler ||  || Switzerland || TKO (Knees)||  ||
|-
! style=background:white colspan=9 |
|- style="background:#cfc;"
| 2013-05-18|| Win||align=left| Matteo Fossati || The Night of Kick and Punch III || Italy || TKO (Corner Stoppage)|| 1 ||3:00
|-  style="background:#fbb;"
| 2012-02-09|| Loss||align=left| Boban Marinkovic ||  || Jagodina, Serbia || Decision (Unanimous) || 5 || 3:00 
|-
! style=background:white colspan=9 |
|-  style="background:#fbb;"
| 2011-10-30|| Loss||align=left| Dean James ||Night Of Champions  || United Kingdom || TKO (Knee) ||2  ||
|-  style="background:#cfc;"
| 2011-09-25|| Win||align=left| Christian Lusabio ||  || Milan, Italy || Decision || 3 || 3:00 
|-
| colspan=9 | Legend:

References

1991 births
Living people
Italian Muay Thai practitioners
ONE Championship kickboxers
ONE Championship champions